Buyezo is a small town located near Potes and Picos de Europa in Cantabria, Spain.

Towns in Spain
Populated places in Cantabria